Let's Make It Legal is a 1951 American comedy film made by Twentieth Century-Fox, directed by Richard Sale and produced by Robert Bassler from a screenplay by I.A.L. Diamond and F. Hugh Herbert, based on a story by Mortimer Braus entitled "My Mother-in-Law, Miriam". The music was by Cyril J. Mockridge and the cinematography by Lucien Ballard.

The film stars Claudette Colbert, Macdonald Carey, Zachary Scott, Barbara Bates and Marilyn Monroe.

Plot
Hugh (Macdonald Carey) and Miriam Halsworth (Claudette Colbert) are in the final stages of their divorce procedure. Miriam wants to separate because he's addicted to gambling - although he often wins. She's living with her daughter Barbara (Barbara Bates), her son-in-law Jerry Denham (Robert Wagner) and her little grandchild. Hugh, who's living at the hotel where he works.

Hugh is also Jerry's boss. They work in the publicity department for the Miramar Hotel and have to follow Victor Macfarland (Zachary Scott), a self-made millionaire who's trying to get on the financial advisory committee for the President. Twenty years ago Hugh and Victor were rivals for Miriam's hand.

A blonde fortune hunter, Joyce Mannering (Marilyn Monroe), is trying to attract Victor, but he's only interested in winning back Miriam. Miriam accepts Victor's marriage proposal, but is disappointed when Victor postpones the marriage for a hearing on his appointment in Washington. Just before he steps on the plane he explains to Miriam why he left her twenty years ago (but the audience can't hear what he says because the plane makes too much noise).

Miriam is furious with Hugh but he doesn't know why. She refuses to let him in, which leads to a comical intermezzo in which Hugh and Jerry are arrested by the police. They are identified by Miriam and Barbara, and leave the police station.

Back home Miriam explains to Hugh that she was so angry because Victor told her that twenty years ago Hugh won her hand in a game of craps. Hugh admits this, and still has those two dice with him. He asks her to throw. It turns out the dice were loaded; they always throw three and four. Hugh admits he cheated because the stake was so high. Miriam is pleased with this explanation and they reconcile.

Cast

 Claudette Colbert as Miriam Halsworth
 Macdonald Carey as Hugh Halsworth
 Zachary Scott as Victor Macfarland
 Barbara Bates as Barbara Denham
 Robert Wagner as Jerry Denham
 Marilyn Monroe as Joyce Mannering
 Frank Cady as Ferguson
 Jim Hayward as Pete the gardener
 Carol Savage as Miss Jessup
 Paul Gerrits as Milkman
 Betty Jane Bowen as Secretary
 Vicki Raaf as Peggy (Hugh's secretary)
 Ralph Sanford as Police Lieutenant
 Harry Denny as Hotel Manager
 Harry Harvey, Sr. as Postman

Critical response
The New York Daily Mirror said of the film: 
 "Claudette Colbert is a capable farceur, but she cannot make Let's Make It Legal as merry as it was hoped. While she is on the Roxy screen the comedy skips along, but when her co-stars take over the plot labors. ... It suffers from a weak script and incredible characterizations by Macdonald Carey and Zachary Scott... Marilyn Monroe parades her shapely chassis for incidental excitement. ... Let's Make It Legal is a valiant effort by Claudette Colbert, who cannot overcome the handicaps."

The New York Daily News stated: 
 "The Roxy's Let's Make It Legal is an inconsistent farce that luckily has sufficient saving graces, the predominating benefit being performances by the popular and comedy-wise co-stars, Claudette Colbert and Macdonald Carey. Their presences and a satisfactory amount of bright dialogue counteract strained farcial situations and indifferent story... Marilyn Monroe is amusing in a brief role as a beautiful shapely blonde who has her eye on Zachary Scott and his millions."

References

External links
 
 
 
 
 

1951 films
1951 romantic comedy films
20th Century Fox films
American romantic comedy films
American black-and-white films
Films directed by Richard Sale
Films based on short fiction
Films scored by Cyril J. Mockridge
Films with screenplays by I. A. L. Diamond
Films about divorce
1950s English-language films
1950s American films